Throughout its more than 120 years of history, the Club de Gimnasia y Esgrima La Plata has had 55 presidents who took on the responsibility of steering the institution. Many of them contributed to the growth of the Club over the years.

The president who had the longest term was Oscar Emir Venturino, who served for 11 years. Héctor Atilio Delmar was the only president to serve three terms: 1983–1989, 1992–1998, and 2010–2012. Miguel Gutiérrez and Edelmiro Palacios had two terms each.

The current president of Gimnasia y Esgrima La Plata is Gabriel Pellegrino. On 15 December 2019, after declining to seek re-election, Pellegrino was re-elected to a three-year term

First president 

Saturnino Perdriel was the founder and first president of Gimnasia y Esgrima La Plata. Perdriel was an outstanding neighbour and merchant during the first few years of the city of La Plata, in addition to being a civil servant at the Treasury Department of the Province of Buenos Aires. He died prematurely in 1888, after one year as club president.

Electoral system 
Nowadays, the president of Club de Gimnasia y Esgrima La Plata is chosen by its associates, by means of general elections that take place every three years. Any club member over 18 years of age, and with at least three years seniority in the club, have a right to vote. Members with over seven years seniority have a right to be elected to the club governmental body, the Management Commission or "Directory".

List of presidents 

Below are listed all the presidents elected since the foundation of the Club de Gimnasia y Esgrima La Plata:

Largest periods

See also 
 Club de Gimnasia y Esgrima La Plata
 History of Club de Gimnasia y Esgrima La Plata

References 

Gimnasia La Plata